Ferry Rotinsulu (born 28 December 1982 in Palu, Central Sulawesi, Indonesia) is a retired Indonesian footballer. He plays as goalkeeper.

He was a goalkeeper for the Indonesia national football team. In the Asian Cup 2007 Rotinsulu was the third goalkeeper after Yandri Pitoy and Markus Horison. He was also a former member of Indonesia U-23 Team at Sea Games 2005 Manila, Philippines, where he was the second choice goalkeeper after Syamsidar.

"I want to be the son of Palu with good contribution for nation by playing football. I wouldn't reach only halfway in my career. I want to be number one goalkeeper." Ferry said.

He is a spider on the web that's difficult to be perforated by enemies, said Arjuna Rinaldi, Sriwijaya's goalkeeping coach. Trying to be consistent and determined, Ferry wants to bring his club to the top achievement. His efforts came to be paid when Sriwijaya won double titles as the champion of Liga Indonesia 2007 and Piala Indonesia 2007. He became one of the key players to the success of the team's double winners.

Rotinsulu reportedly became a goalkeeper because he is a big fan of Italian goalkeeper Gianluigi Buffon.

Rotinsulu is a devout Muslim who observes the Islamic month of  Ramadan.

International career 
In 2007, he played to represent the Indonesia U-23, in 2007 SEA Games.

National Team Career
2005: SEA Games Manila (U-23 Team)
2006: National Training Centre/Camp in The Hague, Netherlands and Asian Games Qatar (U-23 Team)
2007: Asian Cup (Senior Team)

Honours

Club honors
Sriwijaya
Liga Indonesia (1): 2007–08
Indonesia Super League (1): 2011–12
Piala Indonesia (3): 2007–08, 2008–09, 2010
Indonesian Community Shield (1): 2010
Indonesian Inter Island Cup (1): 2012

Country honors
Indonesia
Indonesian Independence Cup (1): 2008

References

External links
 
 

1982 births
Living people
Sportspeople from Central Sulawesi
Minahasa people
Indonesian Muslims
Indonesian footballers
2007 AFC Asian Cup players
Indonesia international footballers
People from Palu
Sriwijaya F.C. players
Persebaya Surabaya players
Liga 1 (Indonesia) players
Association football goalkeepers
Footballers at the 2006 Asian Games
Asian Games competitors for Indonesia